Hot Stuff is a 1979 American action crime comedy film starring Dom DeLuise, Suzanne Pleshette, Jerry Reed and Ossie Davis. DeLuise also directed the film (the only film where he did so), and the song "Hot Stuff" was written and performed by Reed.

The script was co-written by best-selling crime novelist Donald E. Westlake.

Plot
Miami police detectives Ernie, Louise, Ramon, and Doug (played by DeLuise, Pleshette, Avalos, and Reed), frustrated at their inability to convict the criminals they arrest, decide to set up a sting as a fencing operation to trap criminals in a pawn shop, recording the illegal transactions on the (then) new technology of videotape.

With less than helpful support from their captain (Davis), the trio decides to re-sell some of their stolen items to stay in business.  Trouble follows as they run afoul of the local mob boss. Doug sees his car destroyed by a bomb (and laments "I just had it washed"), he and the others have a shootout with gun runners at a waterfront condominium construction site, and they ultimately arrest the criminals en masse at a party.

Main cast
 Dom DeLuise ...  Ernie Fortunato
 Suzanne Pleshette ...  Louise Webster
 Jerry Reed ...  Doug von Horne
 Ossie Davis ...  Captain John Geiberger
 Luis Avalos ...  Ramon
 Pat McCormick ...  Area Mob hitman (man with cigars)
 Marc Lawrence ...  Carmine, Mob Boss
 Sydney Lassick ... Hymie
 Robert George ... Thief with golfclubs

Critical Reception
Movie critic Roger Ebert gave the film 2 1/2 out of 4 stars and said "It is easy to imagine this material not working even though the movie is also livened up by explosions, shootouts and a wild party. Most of the movie's character-building and most of the laughs happen on one set, and repeat the one situation. But the characters are so well-drawn (not deeply drawn, just well drawn) that we get to like them. DeLuise, directing himself, doesn't indulge himself, and gives a lot of the best lines to his three costars."

References

External links
 
 
 
 

1979 films
1979 comedy films
American comedy films
Columbia Pictures films
1979 directorial debut films
Films scored by Patrick Williams
Films set in Miami
Films directed by Dom DeLuise
Films shot in Miami
1970s English-language films
1970s American films